The Sentimental Lady is a 1915 silent film drama produced by George Kleine and starring Irene Fenwick.

A copy is preserved in the Library of Congress collection.

Cast
Irene Fenwick - Amy Cary
Frank Belcher - Amy's Uncle
John Davidson - Norman Van Aulsten
Thomas McGrath - Norman's Father
Jack Devereaux - Bob Nelson
Richie Ling - Johnson
Anna Reader - Johnson's Daughter
Lila Barclay - Helen Nelson
Della Connor - Florence Russell
Ben Taggart - Tom Woodbury

References

External links
The Sentimental Lady at IMDb.com

still of scene

1915 films
American silent feature films
Silent American drama films
1915 drama films
American black-and-white films
1910s American films